Danish singer Oh Land has released five studio albums, four extended plays (EPs), 27 singles (including three as a featured artist), seven promotional singles, and 15 music videos. When signed to Fake Diamond Records, Oh Land released her debut album, Fauna, in November 2008. Following a performance at the 2009 SXSW event, she met a representative from Epic Records and signed with the label. She released her major-label debut single "Sun of a Gun" in October 2010, which charted in five countries and served as the lead single to her 2011 self-titled studio album. Oh Land peaked at number five in Denmark and also entered the Billboard 200 in the United States. It would go on to be certified Platinum for selling over 20,000 copies in the former country. The album spawned four additional singles, including "Wolf & I", "Voodoo", "White Nights", and "Speak Out Now"; the latter two songs both charted within the top twenty in Oh Land's native Denmark and were also certified Gold by IFPI Denmark.

In 2012, the singer was featured on Gym Class Heroes' song "Life Goes On", which entered the Tophit chart in Russia. She released her third studio album, Wish Bone, in 2013 with Tusk or Tooth Records and A:larm Music. It peaked at number four in Denmark and appeared on the Top Heatseekers component chart in the United States. "Renaissance Girls", "Pyromaniac", and "Cherry on Top" were available as singles and all three of them had accompanying music videos, in addition to promotional single "My Boxer". Her fourth studio album, Earth Sick (2014), features the singles "Head Up High" and "Nothing Is Over". Oh Land's first soundtrack album, Askepot, was distributed digitally in 2016 and accompanies a live opera retelling of Cinderella. A music video was created for Wish Bones "Love You Better" in 2016, prompting it to chart on the digital component chart in Denmark at number six. The singer announced that she planned to release her fifth studio album titled Family Tree on 3 May 2019. It reached number 35 in Denmark and spawned four singles: "Human Error", "Brief Moment", "Kiss in Songs", and "Family Tree".

Studio albums

Extended plays

Soundtracks

Singles

As lead artist

As featured artist

Promotional singles

Other charted songs

Guest appearances

Music videos

References

External links 
 
 
 

Discographies of Danish artists
Pop music discographies